Aquilla is a city located in Hill County, Texas, United States. The population was 109 at the 2010 census.

History
From the Handbook of Texas Online:

"Settlers, attracted to the site because it was the nearest point to Hillsboro where timber could be found, began moving into the area in the 1840s. The original settlement, near the site of present Aquilla, was called Mudtown. The community of Aquilla and nearby Aquilla Creek were probably named for early settler Aquilla Jones. The town received a post office in 1859. Twenty years later the tracks of the Texas Central Railroad crossed southwestern Hill County, passing within a few miles of the timber settlement. Shortly thereafter, businesses and residents moved a few miles south to the rail line. The community's population was 175 in 1886 and 100 in 1892. A series of illnesses resulted from drinking creek water, so a well was dug in 1897 to provide fresh water. One of the state's first chartered banks opened at Aquilla in 1905, when the town also had a health spa. In 1910 the population surpassed 200. By 1914 it had a population of over 500 and thirteen retail stores, three hotels, four churches, a school, a newspaper, a bank, and a thriving lumber company. By the late 1950s there were 250 residents and ten businesses in Aquilla. In 2000 there were thirteen businesses and 136 residents."

In 2017 there were 109 residents and two churches.

Geography

Aquilla is located in southwestern Hill County at  (31.852112, –97.219104).

Demographics

As of the census of 2000, there were 136 people, 43 households, and 39 families residing in the city. The population density was 488.4 people per square mile (187.5/km2). There were 51 housing units at an average density of 183.1 per square mile (70.3/km2). The racial makeup of the city was 83.82% White, 7.35% Native American, 8.09% from other races, and 0.74% from two or more races. Hispanic or Latino of any race were 11.76% of the population.

There were 43 households, out of which 53.5% had children under the age of 18 living with them, 74.4% were married couples living together, 11.6% had a female householder with no husband present, and 9.3% were non-families. 7.0% of all households were made up of individuals, and 4.7% had someone living alone who was 65 years of age or older. The average household size was 3.16 and the average family size was 3.28.

In the city, the population was spread out, with 33.8% under the age of 18, 10.3% from 18 to 24, 29.4% from 25 to 44, 16.2% from 45 to 64, and 10.3% who were 65 years of age or older. The median age was 31 years. For every 100 females, there were 109.2 males. For every 100 females age 18 and over, there were 104.5 males.

The median income for a household in the city was $39,500, and the median income for a family was $43,750. Males had a median income of $37,708 versus $17,500 for females. The per capita income for the city was $13,096. There were none of the families and 5.8% of the population living below the poverty line, including no under eighteens and 23.5% of those over 64.

Education
The city is served by the Aquilla Independent School District.

See also

References

External links 
 "Aquilla, TX", in Handbook of Texas Online

Cities in Texas
Cities in Hill County, Texas